Seyed Dariush Mostafavi (born September 8, 1944) is the former chairman of the multisport club Persepolis F.C. based in Tehran, Iran and former chairman of IRIFF. He is also former player of Team Melli, Taj and Persepolis

References

Iranian businesspeople
Iranian football chairmen and investors
Esteghlal F.C. players
Living people
1948 births
Presidents of Iranian Football Federation
Iranian footballers
Iran international footballers
Persepolis F.C. players
Olympic footballers of Iran
Footballers at the 1964 Summer Olympics
Association football fullbacks